Eupithecia vermiculata is a moth in the family Geometridae. It is found in Colombia.

References

Moths described in 1874
vermiculata
Moths of South America